Eptatretus polytrema, the fourteen-gill hagfish or Chilean hagfish, is a demersal and non-migratory hagfish of the genus Eptatretus. It is found in muddy and rocky bottoms of the southeastern area of the Pacific Ocean near the coast of Chile between Coquimbo and Puerto Montt, at depths between 10 and 350 m. This hagfish can reach a length of 93 cm. 
It is only known from a few specimens and has not been recorded since 1988.

References

External links

Myxinidae
Fish of Chile
Fish described in 1855
Endemic fauna of Chile